Alexander B. Goncharov (born April 7, 1960) is a Soviet American mathematician and the Philip Schuyler Beebe Professor of Mathematics at Yale University. He won the EMS Prize in 1992.

Goncharov won a gold medal at the International Mathematical Olympiad in 1976. He attained his doctorate at Lomonosov Moscow State University in 1987, under supervision of Israel Gelfand with thesis Generalized conformal structures on manifolds. Goncharov was an Invited Speaker at the 1994 International Congress of Mathematicians and gave a talk Polylogarithms in arithmetic and geometry.

In 2019, Goncharov was appointed the Philip Schuyler Beebe Professor of Mathematics at Yale University, as well as the Gretchen and Barry Mazur Chair at the Institut des hautes études scientifiques.

Selected publications
 
 (with A. M. Levin) 
 
 (with P. Deligne) 
 (with V. V. Fock)  
 (with V. V. Fock) 
 (with H. Gangl, A. Levin) 
 (with V. V. Fock) 
 (with R. Kenyon) 
 (with T. Dimofte, M. Gabella) 
 (with J. Golden, M. Spradlin, C. Vergu, A. Volovich)

See also
Goncharov conjecture

References

External links
Website at Yale University

1960 births
Living people
American people of Ukrainian-Jewish descent
20th-century American mathematicians
Brown University faculty
International Mathematical Olympiad participants
Soviet mathematicians
Ukrainian mathematicians
21st-century American mathematicians
Yale University alumni